The 2017–18 Princeton Tigers women's basketball team represented Princeton University during the 2017–18 NCAA Division I women's basketball season. The Tigers, led by eleventh year head coach Courtney Banghart, played their home games at Jadwin Gymnasium as members of the Ivy League.

The Tigers finished the season with a 24–6 overall record and 12–2 in the Ivy League. They finished first in the conference and defeated Penn in a playoff to earn a 12-seed for the NCAA tournament. However, they lost in the first round to 5-seed Maryland.

Previous season
The Tigers finished the 2016–17 season with a 16–14 overall record and 9–5 in the Ivy League. They finished second in the conference to play Penn in a playoff to determine which Ivy League team will get a first-round bid for the NCAA tournament. Penn won, but the Tigers' postseason continued with play in the Women's National Invitation Tournament. However, they lost in the first round to Villanova.

During the season, freshman Bella Alarie was named USWBA National Freshman of the Week once, Ivy League Player of the Week three times, and Ivy League Rookie of the Week nine times. She went on to be named  
Ivy League Rookie of the Year, made the Ivy League All-Tournament Team (with junior Leslie Robinson), as well as the All-Ivy League team (also with Robinson).

Alarie was also named to the 2017 USA Basketball Women's U19 National Team. The team won a silver medal, after losing to Russia in the finals. Coach Courtney Banghart was on the coaching staff of the U23 National Team. The team competed in and won the inaugural U24 Four Nations Tournament in Tokyo, Japan.

Roster

Schedule

|-
!colspan=8 style="background:#000000; color:#FF6F00;"| Regular season

|-
!colspan=8 style="background:#000000; color:#FF6F00;"| Ivy League regular season

|-
!colspan=8 style="background:#000000;"| Ivy League Tournament

|-
!colspan=12 style=""|NCAA Women's Tournament

Rankings
2017–18 NCAA Division I women's basketball rankings

References

Princeton
Princeton Tigers women's basketball seasons
Princeton Tigers women's
Princeton Tigers women's
Princeton